The Strong Black Woman Schema, as defined by scholars, is an archetype of how the ideal Black woman should act. This has been characterized by three components: emotional restraint, independence, and caretaking. Strong Black women must hold back their emotions to avoid appearing weak, portray themselves as strong and independent while being responsible for the problems of others, and take care of those problems as if they were their own.  Stemming from stereotypes of enslaved Black women, the schema grew from the intersectional oppression Black women face from society's expectations. The notion that as women, they must uphold feminine standards, but as Black women, they must balance that with the responsibility of being emotionally and physically strong; this is also known as intersectionality. Some examples of idealized Strong Black Women in today's society include Michelle Obama, Oprah, Beyonce, and Serena Williams. These women's attributes are placed on a pedestal as the standard for how Strong Black Women can achieve great success in our society. While these women have overcome the odds of those set for Black women centuries ago from slavery to the suffrage movement, they are the exception and not the rule in most cases. Black women are not all offered the same opportunities, but are still held to the same standard of being almost indestructible. That is why the Strong Black Woman is considered a schema, because schemas are malleable and therefore are ever changing as society's expectations of womanhood and strength evolve.

History
Black women have a complicated history in the United States. The first view of Black women in society was mostly as slaves. This is where the harmful stereotypes known as the Jezebel, Mammy, and the Sapphire stem from. These stereotypes put Black women in a box and gave white people a fragmented lens to look at them through. Kimberly Wallace Sanders wrote a note titled Mammy: A Century of Race, Gender, and Southern Memory in an effort to uncover the history of the Mammy figure in literature, media, and memoirs of slaves. She describes the Mammy as "the ultimate symbol of maternal devotion" and recognizes how this image helped define "the nature of slavery, gender relations, motherhood, and memory in the American South." The Mammy was the female slave who was responsible for household activity and often taking care of white children and slave children. She could be seen as the first example of the Strong Black Woman Schema due to her endless responsibilities and expectation to provide and care without complaint. This stereotype outlived slavery and can be seen across popular media forms such as the movie Gone with the Wind where Hattie McDaniel portrays a Mammy in a nostalgic old South plantation home. The first record in the media is DW Griffith's 1915 film The Birth of a Nation where the Mammy figure defends her masters' plantation during the Civil War. The misrepresentation of these Mammy figures in the media try to show these women as happy house slaves that enjoyed serving their Master and Mistress. This false narrative is used as a way to legitimize slavery and white supremacy.

Black feminism writers have spoken up about the misinformation surrounding the Strong Black Woman Schema and how it holds Black women to an unrealistic and unachievable standard. One of these women is Joan Morgan, who wrote her book, When Chickenheads Come Home To Roost, to discuss her experiences as a Black woman and her relationship with hip-hop feminism. In the chapter titled "strongblackwomen" she discusses her choice to retire from being a Strong Black Woman. She states that "Retirement was ultimately an act of salvation. Being an SBW was killing me slowly. Cutting off my air supply." This speaks to the weight that Black women feel on their shoulders from trying to uphold the SBW Schema. She continues to write about how her life became consumed with solving other peoples problems and left no time to take care of herself. This is the dark side to the SBW Schema where Black women have been shown stereotypes like the Mammy figure on television throughout their life and seen examples of their own mother or other women in their life upholding the Strong Black Woman lifestyle. These expectations to be a Strong Black Woman at all times become internalized and influence the ability for Black women to show any kind of weakness that their white counterparts are allowed to show. 

The history of the Strong Black Woman Schema comes from decades of reinforcement of unrealistic stereotypes for Black women. Seen on television and read in books, Black women are expected to maintain an image of perfection and strength. Intersectional oppression and white supremacy allow these images to persist without regard for the mental and physical consequences this lifestyle creates.

Research/ health effects
While certain qualities that encompass a Strong Black Woman would be looked at as admirable or desirable, there is a harmful history and expectation that Black women are expected to carry. This plays out in the home, the workplace, and day-to-day life. Black women must appear to overcome any obstacle without weakness, but the appearance of strength can manifest deeper issues within. These issues have been studied and show many links between the Strong Black Woman Schema and mental as well as physical health problems. The article "The Strong Black Woman: Insights and Implications for Nursing" compiles evidence from several studies to discuss the overall impact the Strong Black Woman Schema has on the health of Black women and specifically the racism present within healthcare education and practice. The article “The danger of the ‘strong Black woman’ trope for mental health” features evidence collected by the National Institutes of Health, highlighting the notion depression for women is prevalent rather than male counterparts in comparison. From phrases as small as "Black don't crack" to the lack of understanding about how Black patient's bodies react differently than white patients, there are damaging effects from believing in an inaccurate stereotype like the Strong Black Woman Schema. Some examples include higher levels of stress, anxiety, depression, and even greater instances of suicide and substance abuse.  Attempting to get help professionally- or even from a friend- is frowned upon, as that would appear to be the opposite of strength. Black women often work in jobs with less flexibility, again forcing them to choose work over their own well-being.

Specifically, this article highlights how the profession of nursing is impacted by the SBW Schema. For Black women who are nurses, they must actively work to overcome decades of institutional racism built into their practice. This can be seen from the lack of representation within the profession and every medical standard being based on how a white person should feel or react to treatment. While the medical field does acknowledge some differences between Black and white patients, it is not to the benefit of Black patients. A 2007 study found that doctors were more inclined to underestimate feelings of pain in Black patients compared to their other patients. These disparities may be explained by unconscious biases held by medical professionals and these biases stem from harmful stereotypes such as the SBW Schema. This also means that Black women are facing greater risks specifically when it comes to childbirth as they are assumed to feel less pain than white mothers. To overcome these disadvantages, Black patients and medical professionals must work harder than their white counterparts to combat discrimination tied to the Strong Black Woman Schema. 

One study that goes into greater detail about mental health is "African American Women's Beliefs About Mental Illness, Stigma and Preferred Coping behaviors" by Earlise C. Ward & Susan M. Heidrich. Within this study, both Ward & Heidrich examined Black women’s representations/beliefs about mental illness (i.e. depression/anxiety), if they felt any stigma associated with seeking treatment for said mental illness, and if these perceptions differed by age group.

This study was from 2005 to 2006 with 185 women all across America. These women were placed within 3 groups: 25–45 years old (young), 46–65 years old (middle-aged), and 66–85 years old (old) and were given tests. Based on the spectrums that were presented, results indicated that within these 3 groups family-related stress and social stress because of racism and sexism within the African-American community created serious consequences that are recurrent and generational. These same participants affirmed high levels of stigma across the board. Ward & Heidrich found that mental illness in the Black community was associated with the stigma of shame, doubt, and embarrassment within both the affected individual and that individual's family, in which they hid the illness in response to it becoming public. This study goes a step further to explain the attitude within the Black community towards receiving help. It also shows that Black women are feeling this stress and anxiety from all of their responsibilities; they are not immune as the Strong Black Woman Schema would suggest.

21st century identity 
In the 21st century, Black women are using the internet to deconstruct the controlled image of what it means to be a Strong Black Woman. The concept of "controlling images", discussed on "You have to Show Strength" by Patricia Hill Collins, explores the control of the pop culture on confining Black womanhood to Negative Stereotypes. She writes that "[the] dominant ideology of the slave era fostered the creation of several interrelated, socially constructed controlling images of Black womanhood, each reflecting the dominant group's interest in maintaining Black women’s subordination".

Relationships with other stereotypes 
The strong black woman stems from other tropes upholding specific archetypes and traits used to depict black women in media. The angry black woman serves as a base due to the underlying portrayal of being aggressive in nature, and often used as comedic relief.  The mammy stereotype depicts black women as caregivers, motherly/helpful figures, and submissive.

Portrayals 
Examples of media containing "the strong black woman" character within a show or film include:

 Annalise Keating, from How to Get Away With Murder, played by Viola Davis

 Celie, from The Color Purple, played by Whoopi Goldberg
 Katherine Johnson, from Hidden Figures, played by Taraji P. Henson
 Michonne, from The Walking Dead, played by Danai Gurira
 Olivia Pope, from Scandal, played by Kerry Washington
 Patsey, from 12 Years a Slave, played by Lupita Nyong'o
 Sofia, from The Color Purple, played by Oprah Winfrey

References

Black studies
African-American women
Stereotypes of African Americans
Stereotypes of women
Stereotypes of black women